Watson may refer to:

Companies
 Actavis, a pharmaceutical company formerly known as Watson Pharmaceuticals
 A.S. Watson Group, retail division of Hutchison Whampoa
 Thomas J. Watson Research Center, IBM research center
 Watson Systems, maker of shopping trolleys
 A. J. Watson, IndyCar roadster chassis constructor
 Watsons Water, a bottled water company in Hong Kong

Computing
 Watson (computer), an IBM supercomputer which won the game show Jeopardy!
 Dr. Watson (debugger), the internal debugger for the Windows platform
 Intellext Watson, an application for the Windows platform
 Karelia Watson, an application for the Macintosh platform

Name
Watson (surname)
Watson (given name)

Fictional characters
 Dr. Watson, a character in Sherlock Holmes stories
 Mary Jane Watson, a Spider-Man character
 Esme Watson, a character in Australian television program A Country Practice

Places
Antarctica
 Watson Peninsula, South Orkney Islands

Australia
 Watson, Australian Capital Territory
 Division of Watson, an electoral district of the Australian House of Representatives
 Watson, South Australia, a stop on the Trans-Australian Railway
 Watson Island (Queensland), an island in Howick Group National Park, Queensland, Australia

Canada
 Watson, Saskatchewan
 Watson Island (British Columbia), an island in the Queen Charlotte Strait in British Columbia, Canada
 Watson Lake, Yukon

United States 
 Watson, Alabama
 Watson, Arkansas
 Watson Island, a neighborhood in Miami, Florida
 Watson, Illinois
 Watson, Indiana
 Watson, Iowa
 Watson, Louisiana
 Watson, Minnesota
 Watson, Missouri
 Watson, New York
 Watson, Ohio
 Watson, Oklahoma
 Watson, Virginia
 Watson, West Virginia
 Watson House (Chincoteague Island, Virginia)
Watson Township (disambiguation)

Other
 Watson, an American singer and songwriter
 Jeannette K. Watson Fellowship, internship grant
 Thomas J. Watson Fellowship, travel grant
 The Watson Twins, an indie country-rock group
 George Watson's College, a school in Edinburgh, Scotland
 USS Watson (DD-482), a proposed United States Navy destroyer canceled in 1946
 Watson (crater), a lunar impact crater on the far side of the Moon

See also
 Justice Watson (disambiguation)